Palygorskite or attapulgite is a magnesium aluminium phyllosilicate with the chemical formula ) that occurs in a type of clay soil common to the Southeastern United States.  It is one of the types of fuller's earth. Some smaller deposits of this mineral can be found in Mexico, where its use is tied to the manufacture of Maya blue in pre-Columbian times.

Name

Palygorskite was first described in 1862 for a deposit at Palygorskaya on the Popovka River, Middle Urals, Permskaya Oblast, Russia.

The synonym attapulgite is derived from the U.S. town of Attapulgus, in the extreme southwest corner of the state of Georgia, where the mineral is abundant and surface-mined.

Mining and usage

Mineral deposit in the US
Two companies are involved in the industrial extraction and processing of gellant-grade attapulgite clay within the same Attapulgus deposit: Active Minerals International, LLC, and BASF Corp. In 2008, BASF acquired the assets of Zemex Attapulgite, leaving only two gellant-grade producers.  Active Minerals operates a dedicated factory to produce the patented product Actigel 208 and built a new state-of-the-art production process in early 2009 involving portable plant processing at the mine site.

Properties

Attapulgite clays are a composite of smectite and palygorskite.  Smectites are expanding lattice clays, of which bentonite is a commonly known generic name for smectite clays. The palygorskite component is an acicular bristle-like crystalline form that does not swell or expand. Attapulgite forms gel structures in fresh and salt water by establishing a lattice structure of particles connected through hydrogen bonds.

Attapulgite, unlike some bentonite (sodium rich montmorillonites), can gel in sea water, forming gel structures in salt water and is used in special saltwater drilling mud for drilling formations contaminated with salt. Palygorskite particles can be considered as charged particles with zones of positive and negative charges. The bonding of these alternating charges allows them to form gel suspensions in salt and fresh water.

Attapulgite clays found in the Meigs-Quincy district are bundles of palygorskite clay particles between 2 and 3 μm long and below 3 nm in diameter. The bundles are surrounded by a matrix of smectite clays that are slightly swellable.   Dry-process grades contain up to 25% non-attapulgite material in the form of carbonates and other mineral inclusions. Processing of the clays consist of drying and grinding the crude clay to specific particle size distributions with specific ranges of gel viscosity measured by a variety of means depending on the end use.

Gel-grade, dry-processed attapulgites are used in a very wide range of applications for suspension, reinforcement, and binding properties.  Paints, sealants, adhesives, tape-joint compound, catalysts, suspension fertilizers, wild-fire suppressants, foundry coatings, animal feed suspensions, and molecular sieve binders are just a few uses of dry-process attapulgite.

7% - 10% attapulgite clay mixed with the eutectic salt, sodium sulfate decahydrate (mirabilite or Glauber's salt), keeps anhydrous crystals suspended in the solution, where they hydrate during phase transition and hence contribute to the heat absorbed and released when Glaubers salt is used for heat storage.

Stabilization of nanopalygorskite suspensions was improved using mechanical dispersion (magnetic stirring, high-speed shearing and ultrasonication) and polyelectrolytes (carboxymethyl cellulose, alginate, sodium polyphosphate, and poly(sodium acrylate)) at different pH. Surface energy and nanoroughness were studied in a palygorskite sample.

Medical use
Attapulgite is used widely in medicine. Taken by mouth, it physically binds to acids and toxic substances in the stomach and digestive tract. Also, as an antidiarrheal, it was believed to work by adsorbing the diarrheal pathogen. For this reason, it has been used in several antidiarrheal medications, including Diar-Aid, Diarrest, Diasorb, Diatabs, Diatrol, Donnagel, Kaopek, K-Pek, Parepectolin, and Rheaban.  It has been used for decades to treat diarrhea.

Until 2003, Kaopectate marketed in the US also contained attapulgite. However, at that time, the U.S. Food and Drug Administration retroactively rejected medical studies showing its efficacy, calling them insufficient. Kaopectate's U.S. formula was changed to bismuth subsalicylate (pink bismuth). The next year (2004), an additional change in labeling was made; from then on, Kaopectate was no longer recommended for children under 12 years old. Nevertheless, Kaopectate with attapulgite is still available in Canada and elsewhere. Until the early 1990s, Kaopectate used the similar clay product kaolinite with pectin (hence the name).

Construction 
Palygorskite can be added to lime mortar with metakaolin for period-correct restoration of mortar at cultural heritage sites.

In human culture
Palygorskite is known to have been a key constituent of the pigment called Maya blue, which was used notably by the pre-Columbian Maya civilization of Mesoamerica on ceramics, sculptures, murals, and (most probably) Maya textiles. The clay mineral was also used by the Maya as a curative for certain illnesses, and evidence shows it was also added to pottery temper.

A Maya region source for palygorskite was unknown until the 1960s, when one was found at a cenote on the Yucatán Peninsula near the modern township of Sacalum, Yucatán. A second possible site was more recently (2005) identified, near Ticul, Yucatán.

The Maya blue synthetic pigment was also manufactured in other Mesoamerican regions and used by other Mesoamerican cultures, such as the Aztecs of central Mexico. The blue coloration seen on Maya and Aztec codices, and early colonial-era manuscripts and maps, is largely produced by the organic-inorganic mixture of añil leaves and palygorskite, with smaller amounts of other mineral additives. Human sacrificial victims in postclassic Mesoamerica were frequently daubed with this blue pigmentation.

See also

Notes

References

External links
 
  Attapulgite clay patent
  Attapulgite, historical marker

Magnesium minerals
Antidiarrhoeals
Medicinal clay
Clay minerals group
Monoclinic minerals
Minerals in space group 12